The Fanziliao River is a small river in Miaoli County, Taiwan.

See also
List of rivers in Taiwan

References

Rivers of Taiwan
Landforms of Miaoli County